The 4th AARP Movies for Grownups Awards, presented by AARP the Magazine, honored films released in 2004 made by people over the age of 50. This was the last year that the awards were announced by the magazine without an in-person awards ceremony. Lynn Redgrave won the award for Breakaway Performance for Kinsey. This year's ceremony also featured a number of noncompetitive, less-serious awards, such as the "Who's Your Daddy? Romantic Gap Prize" for the movie with the most implausible age gap in a romantic pair. This was the last year for which there was no in-person awards ceremony; instead, winners were sent a trophy in the shape of a golden theater seat, called La Chaise d'Or.

Awards

Winners and Nominees

Winners are listed first, highlighted in boldface, and indicated with a double dagger.

Breakaway Accomplishment
 Lynn Redgrave: "Redgrave appears for just over two minutes and 50 seconds, yet after nearly 40 years of roles that barely touched on her skills, her soliloquy as a woman telling her story to the controversial sex researcher is so breathtaking and heartfelt she delivers what amounts to a benediction."

Runners Up
 Tom Selleck for Ike: Countdown to D-Day
 Meryl Streep for Stuck on You

Other Awards and Prizes
 Who's Your Daddy? Romantic Gap Prize: Steve Martin (60) and Claire Danes (26) in Shopgirl
 Woman of the Year: Joan Allen for Off the Map, Yes, and The Upside of Anger
 Best DVD Rerelease: Dracula
 Medal of Bravery: Jane Seymour, "for her fearlessly sexy romp as the senator's wife in Wedding Crashers."
 Not-Scared-Shirtless Prize: Liam Neeson (Batman Begins) and Dennis Quaid (Yours, Mine & Ours)
 Remake from Hell Award: The Honeymooners
 Worst Roommate: Tom Cruise and Tim Robbins in War of the Worlds
 Christopher Walken 911 Award: "Mediocre flicks saved by his mere presence: 2 (Domino and Romance and Cigarettes)"

Films with multiple nominations

References

AARP Movies for Grownups Awards
AARP